Eleonora (minor planet designation: 354 Eleonora) is a large, stony main-belt asteroid that was discovered by the French astronomer Auguste Charlois on January 17, 1893, in Nice.

Photometric observations of this asteroid gave a light curve with a period of 13.623 hours. The data was used to construct a model for the asteroid, revealing it to be a regular-shaped object, spinning about a pole with ecliptic coordinates (β, λ) = (+20°, 356°), although this is with an accuracy of only ±10°. The ratio of the major to minor axes lengths is roughly equal to 1.2. It is classified as an S-type asteroid and has an estimated size of 154.34 km. The spectrum of 354 Eleonora reveals the strong presence of the mineral olivine, a relatively rarity in the asteroid belt.

During favorable oppositions, such as in 1968 and 2010, Eleonora can reach an apparent magnitude of +9.31.

References

External links 
 
 

000354
Discoveries by Auguste Charlois
Named minor planets
000354
000354
18930117